Dolphin Cove may refer to:
Dolphin Cove (SeaWorld), a SeaWorld theme park attraction
Dolphin Cove (TV series), a TV drama created by Peter Benchley, set in Queensland, Australia
Dolphin Cove Jamaica, a tourist attraction chain in Jamaica